5,6-dimethylbenzimidazole synthase (BluB) is an enzyme with systematic name FMNH2 oxidoreductase (5,6-dimethylbenzimidazole forming). This enzyme catalyses the following chemical reaction

 FMNH2 + NADH + H+ + O2  5,6-dimethylbenzimidazole + D-erythrose 4-phosphate + NAD+ + other product

The C-2 of 5,6-dimethylbenzimidazole is derived from C-1' of the ribityl group of FMNH2 and 2-H from the ribityl 1'-pro-S hydrogen. This enzyme is part of the biosynthetic pathway to cobalamin (vitamin B12) in bacteria.

See also
 Cobalamin biosynthesis

References

External links 
 

EC 1.14.99